Her Loss is a collaborative studio album by Canadian rapper Drake and Atlanta-based rapper 21 Savage. It was released on November 4, 2022, through OVO Sound and Republic Records. The album features a sole guest appearance from Travis Scott.

Despite receiving mixed reviews from critics, Her Loss performed well commercially, debuting at number one on the Canadian Albums and US Billboard 200 charts, among other countries.

Background
The album came after the duo's previous collaborations on "Sneakin' (2016), "Issa" (2017), "Mr. Right Now" (2020), and "Knife Talk" (2021). On June 17, 2022, Drake released the song "Jimmy Cooks" featuring 21 Savage as the final track of his seventh studio album Honestly, Nevermind. Upon release, the song was the most successful track off the album and debuted at number one on the Billboard Hot 100, but the song was not officially serviced to mainstream radio as a single until October 11. On October 19, Drake performed as a surprise guest at one of 21 Savage's concerts in Atlanta. 

On October 21, Drake announced the "Jimmy Cooks" music video would be released on 21 Savage's 30th birthday a day later. The video was eventually released that day. The visuals were briefly interrupted at the 1:25-mark, with text in typographic letters appearing reading "Her Loss – album by Drake and 21 Savage – October 28, 2022". The album was then confirmed by OVO and Republic on their social media. On October 26, Drake announced the album had been delayed to November 4, 2022, due to OVO record producer 40 contracting COVID-19 during the album's mixing and mastering process. The tracklist was revealed on November 3.

Artwork
The cover art features adult dancer and model Quiana "Qui" Yasuka, also known as Suki Baby. It was posted by the rappers on their Instagram profiles on November 2. The then three-year old photograph was taken by Paris Aden, and was discovered by Lil Yachty, who successfully proposed it as the cover art.

Promotion
On November 1, 2022, Drake and 21 Savage began a joint fake press run for the album, spoofing common contemporary music promotion techniques. These included a Vogue cover, which was handed out by street teams and contained edited photos of Hailey Bieber and Jennifer Lawrence with 21 Savage's face tattoos. Other spoofs included a fake Cartier advertisement, a fake Tiny Desk Concert introduction, and a deepfake interview on The Howard Stern Show. They also mimicked televised and online live performances, such as performing "On BS" on Saturday Night Live (which guest starred Michael B. Jordan) and "Privileged Rappers" on a gold plated set of ColorsxStudios.

"Circo Loco" was sent to Italian contemporary hit radio on November 11, 2022, as the first official single from the album.

Critical reception

Her Loss was met with mixed reviews. At Metacritic, which assigns a normalized rating out of 100 to reviews from professional publications, the album received an average score of 62, based on 12 reviews, indicating "generally favorable reviews". Aggregator AnyDecentMusic? gave it 5.5 out of 10, based on their assessment of the critical consensus.

Vernon Ayiku of Exclaim! praised the album, stating, "While Her Loss houses no immediate street bangers or Billboard hits, it's the sum that makes it Drake's best record this decade. From the comical fake promos during its rollout to the memorable one-liners and aggressive diss verses or the TikTok memes it will generate for months to come, Her Loss has a lot of meat on its bones". Marcus Shorter from Consequence enjoyed the album, saying, "Her Loss isn't always a deep album, but that doesn't make it any less profound. Sometimes excellent rapping over very dope beats mixed with a tinge of introspection goes a long way. Her Loss is our gain". Alex Swhear of Variety said, "Though not without its missteps, Her Loss leaves the unshakable impression that Drake, in 2022, is doing what inspires him rather than pandering. One year from Certified Lover Boy, that [is] a surprising and encouraging evolution". In a lukewarm review, RapReviewss Steve "Flash" Juon said, "It's a better Drake album than Honestly, Nevermind [but] it's not a better 21 [Savage] album than I Am > I Was (2018) or Issa (2017). If you split the difference you wind up with an average album. There are a few [songs] I'd care to play more than once". Writing for Pitchfork, Paul A. Thompson stated, "There are moments of considered writing and bursts of Drake at or near his mischievous best, but in its middle, the record becomes inert, making the bits of self-conscious misanthropy scan as strained rather than gleeful, as if the id could be focus-grouped". Reviewing the album for Paste, Josh Svetz stated: "The best moments come when the duo find a balance and Drake falls back on his crate-digging prowess. ... Sadly, there's not enough of this to go around, making Her Loss another disposable Drake project that will fade away in a few weeks—one that could have been so much more".

In a mixed review, Clashs Robin Murray said, "This new album is the perfect piece of fan service. It's [Drake] on the mic, 21 Savage in full flow. The roll out – which pirated a Tiny Desk session and copied a Vogue cover – was pitch perfect, two artists subverting the expectations placed on them... It's a shame that Her Loss often feels entirely predictable. The foes that punctuate their bars are well-worn – less talented adversaries, love interests who leech on their wealth and prestige – and while it's nice to hear Drake unleashed, at times 21 Savage can feel like a passenger". Paul Attard of Slant Magazine said, "Uneven. ... There's simply too little give and take between this pairing to justify calling this a mutually beneficial partnership". In a negative review, Rolling Stones Mosi Reeves said, "As Her Loss abandons 21 [Savage]'s form of smack talk as a playful, revelatory exercise, its tone shifts to Drake's toxic petulance... There's a gloominess this time around, and it's not just sloppy sequencing and hit-or-miss quality that ranges from clear standouts like "Pussy & Millions" [or] "Treacherous Twins", to aimless dross like "Major Distribution". [The album] is a singular misfire".

Year-end lists

Controversy
According to reports, Drake dissed several prominent celebrities throughout Her Loss, which received widespread media coverage and controversy. On "Circo Loco", he raps, "This bitch lie 'bout gettin' shots but she still a stallion / She don't even get the joke, but she still smilin', which was interpreted as a double entendre that referenced women being dishonest about getting lip and buttock augmentations, and implied that Megan Thee Stallion was lying about her 2020 shooting allegations against Tory Lanez. Lil Yachty, who produced several songs on the album, stated "Circo Loco" did not reference Megan Thee Stallion, although she responded on Twitter, writing, "Stop using my shooting for clout bitch ass Niggas! Since when tf is it cool to joke abt women getting shot! You niggas especially RAP NIGGAS ARE LAME! Ready to boycott bout shoes and clothes but dog pile on a black woman when she say one of y'all homeboys abused her." Rolling Stones Mosi Reeves wrote the controversy made Drake "unintentionally reveal himself as a self-centered jerk who refuses to grow up."

On "Middle of the Ocean", Drake references his ex-girlfriend Serena Williams and her husband Alexis Ohanian, rapping, "Sidebar, Serena, your husband a groupie / He claim we don't got a problem but / No, boo, it is like you comin' for sushi / We might pop up on 'em at will like Suzuki." Ohanian addressed the reference on Twitter, writing "The reason I stay winning is because I'm relentless about being the best at whatever I do – including being the best groupie for my wife and [my] daughter." On "Backoutsideboyz", Drake was interpreted as dissing both DRAM, saying "Try to bring the dram' to me / He ain't know how we 'Cha Cha Slide') and Ice Spice ("She a 10 tryin' to rap, it's good on mute").

Four days after the album's release, Drake and 21 Savage were sued by Condé Nast, the publisher for Vogue, in a Manhattan federal court who alleged their promotional campaign "entirely" relied on the unauthorised use of their trademarks and false representations relating to their business and business relationships. Condé Nast sought at least $4 million, or triple the defendants' profits from Her Loss, punitive damages, and to end any trademark infringement, and claimed they reached out to Drake and 21 Savage prior to taking legal action.

Commercial performance
Her Loss debuted at number one on the US Billboard 200 with 404,000 album-equivalent units, including 12,000 pure album sales, replacing Taylor Swift's Midnights (2022) from the top spot. Her Loss earned a total of 513.56 million on-demand streams. The album is Drake and 21 Savage's twelfth and third number-one album in the US, respectively. The following week, Her Loss descended to number two.

Track listing

Notes
  signifies a co-producer
  signifies an additional producer

Sample credits
 "Rich Flex" contains samples of the score of Invasion of the Bee Girls, composed by Charles Bernstein; as well as samples of "I Want You, Girl", written by Gladys Hayes and performed by Sugar; interpolations of "Savage", written by Megan Pete, Anthony White, and Bobby Session Jr., as performed by Megan Thee Stallion; interpolations of "24's", written by Clifford Harris Jr. and Aldrin Davis, as performed by T.I.; and interpolations of "Red Opps", written by Shéyaa Abraham-Joseph and performed by 21 Savage.
 "Major Distribution" contains samples of "East Village", written by Elijah Fox-Peck and performed by Elijah Fox.
 "Privileged Rappers" contains samples of "Ballad for the Fallen Soldier", written by Ronald Isley, O'Kelly Isley Jr., Rudolph Isley, Ernie Isley, Marvin Isley, and Chris Jasper, as performed by The Isley Brothers.
 "Spin Bout U" contains samples of "Give Me Your Lov-N", written by Tenaia Sanders and Dwayne Armstrong, as performed by B.G.O.T.I.
 "Hours in Silence" contains samples of "Talk Ya Ass Off Part 2", written by Paul Beauregard, as performed by DJ Paul, Juicy J, and Kingpin Skinny Pimp.
 "Treacherous Twins" contains samples of "Lonely Daze", written by Elgin Lumpkin, Timothy Mosley, Melvin Barcliff, Thom Bell, and Linda Creed, as performed by Ginuwine.
 "Circo Loco" contains samples of "One More Time", written by Thomas Bangalter, Guy-Manuel de Homem-Christo, and Anthony Moore, as performed by Daft Punk.
 "Middle of the Ocean" contains samples of "Real Niggas", written by Cameron Giles, Joseph Jones II, LaRon James, and Darryl Pittman, as performed by The Diplomats; as well as samples of "Cry Together", written by Kenneth Gamble and Leon Huff, as performed by The O'Jays.

Personnel
Musicians
 Drake – vocals (tracks 1–14, 16)
 21 Savage – vocals (1–3, 5–11, 14, 15)
 Travis Scott – vocals (10)
 Birdman – additional vocals (1, 12)
 Young Nudy – additional vocals (1)
 Tay Keith – drums (1, 9)
 Vinylz – drums (1, 9)
 Elijah Fox – additional vocals (2)
 Big Bank – additional vocals (3)
 Lil Yachty – additional vocals (4), background vocals (13)
 Noah Shebib – additional keyboards (5)
 Noel Cadastre – drums, keyboards (8)
 Oz – drums (8)
 Dougie F – background vocals (16)

Technical
 Chris Athens – mastering
 Dave Huffman – mastering (1–8), mastering assistance (9–16)
 Noah Shebib – mixing (all tracks)
 Noel Cadastre – mixing (1–13, 15, 16), recording (1–7, 10–16), mixing assistance (14)
 Metro Boomin – mixing (14)
 Ethan Stevens – mixing (14), recording (10)
 Les Bateman – engineering
 Isaiah Brown – recording (1–3, 5–7, 11, 14, 15)
 Harley Arsenault – mixing assistance (1–13, 15, 16)
 Greg Moffet – mixing assistance (1, 9–16)

Charts

Weekly charts

Year-end charts

Certifications

Release history

References

2022 albums
21 Savage albums
Collaborative albums
Drake (musician) albums
OVO Sound albums
Republic Records albums
Epic Records albums
Albums produced by Boi-1da
Albums produced by Metro Boomin
Albums produced by Tay Keith
Albums produced by Taz Taylor (record producer)
Albums produced by Vinylz
Albums produced by Wheezy